Prostanthera palustris, commonly known as  swamp mint-bush, is a species of flowering plant in the family Lamiaceae and is endemic to a restricted area of New South Wales. It is a low, spreading, weak shrub with spatula-shaped leaves and pale mauve and white flowers with yellow spots in the petal tube.

Description
Flowering mainly occurs from February to June.

Taxonomy
Prostanthera palustris was first formally described in 1997 by Barry Conn in the journal Telopea from material collected in Bundjalung National Park in 1990.

Distribution and habitat
Swamp mint-bush grows in wet coastal shrubland and heathland in Bundjalung National Park.

Conservation status
This mintbush is classified as "vulnerable" under the Australian Government Environment Protection and Biodiversity Conservation Act 1999 and the New South Wales Government Biodiversity Conservation Act 2016. The main threats to the species include inappropriate fire regimes, trampling and vegetation clearance.

References

palustris
Flora of New South Wales
Lamiales of Australia
Plants described in 1997
Taxa named by Barry John Conn